The Alabama and Florida Railway  was a short-line railroad headquartered in Andalusia, Alabama. It was owned and operated by Pioneer Railcorp of Peoria, Illinois. It operated a former Louisville and Nashville Railroad branch line from Andalusia to Geneva, Alabama. The company abandoned the entire line in 2011.

History 

The company was organized in 1992 when parent Pioneer Railcorp acquired the entirety of the Alabama and Florida Railroad. This included  between Georgiana and Geneva, Alabama and a  line in the vicinity of Andalusia which had been leased from the Andalusia and Conecuh Railroad. Operations began on November 23, 1992.  of track from Georgiana to Andalusia, including the track within Andalusia, was sold to Gulf and Ohio Railways and named the Three Notch Railroad on June 11, 2001. On August 9, 2011, the AF filed an exemption notice with the Surface Transportation Board to abandon its entire line.

Links
HawkinsRails.net - Alabama & Florida Railway

References

Defunct Alabama railroads
Switching and terminal railroads
Pioneer Lines
Railway companies established in 1992
Railway companies disestablished in 2011
1992 establishments in Alabama
2011 disestablishments in Alabama